Agustín Muñiz (born 28 August 1921) was a Uruguayan boxer. He competed in the men's heavyweight event at the 1948 Summer Olympics.

References

External links
 

1921 births
Possibly living people
Uruguayan male boxers
Olympic boxers of Uruguay
Boxers at the 1948 Summer Olympics
Heavyweight boxers